Craig Carnelia (born 1949) is an American musical theater composer and singer, known for his collaboration on the musicals Working and Sweet Smell of Success.

Biography
Carnelia grew up in Floral Park, New York. He was exposed to Broadway at the age of fourteen when he was inspired by the Richard Rodgers musical No Strings. He played guitar, was in a folksinging group and taught himself to play the piano. While attending Hofstra University he won the role of The Boy in off-Broadway's The Fantasticks, and dropped out of school as a sophomore. 

After a short stint in the production, Carnelia pursued songwriting and, later, musical theatre composition. Carnelia has one child, actress Daisy Carnelia, and lives in Springfield, Missouri with his wife, actress Lisa Brescia. His Poster Boy (2016) was performed at the Williamstown Theater Festival in Williamstown, Massachusetts.

Carnelia's songs were heard with the work of other writers in the Stephen Schwartz conceptual revue Working (1978).

From there he wrote full scores, both lyrics and music, for the short-lived Broadway musical Is there life after high school? (1982), which is still performed in stock, amateur, and regional theatres. He composed lyrics and music for Three Postcards, with a book by Craig Lucas, which was staged off-Broadway by Playwrights Horizons in 1987 and revived by Circle Rep in 1994.

For the musical Sweet Smell of Success (2002), he teamed with composer Marvin Hamlisch, with whom he also composed songs for the 2002 Nora Ephron play Imaginary Friends.

He has received the Johnny Mercer Award, "Emerging American Songwriter", the first annual Gilman and Gonzalez-Falla Musical Theater Award, and the Kleban Award.  He also is a mentor to young writers through the ASCAP Musical Theatre Workshop, the Dramatists Guild Musical Theatre Fellowship and the Eugene O’Neill Musical Theatre Conference.

Awards and nominations
1978 Tony Award Best Original Score Working – Music (nominee)
1978 Tony Award Best Original Score Working – Lyrics (nominee)
2002 Drama Desk Award Outstanding Lyrics Sweet Smell of Success (nominee) 
2002 Tony Award Best Original Musical Score – Lyrics Sweet Smell of Success (nominee)
2003 Drama Desk Award Outstanding Lyrics Imaginary Friends (nominee)

References

External links

 Craig Carnelia at the Internet Off-Broadway Database

1949 births
Living people
Place of birth missing (living people)
American male singers
American musical theatre composers
Broadway composers and lyricists
Hofstra University alumni
People from Floral Park, New York
American male stage actors